Angela Kennedy (born 28 February 1976) is an Australian former butterfly swimmer of the 1990s, who won a silver medal in the 4×100-metre medley relay at the 1996 Summer Olympics in Atlanta, Georgia.

Professional career
In 1994, Kennedy attended the NSW State Open Short-Course Championships in Sydney. She set a record in every 50m and 100m event in the program, achieving 11 records in total.

Kennedy broke the world record in the 100m butterfly at the World Short-Course Swimming Championships in 1995, however was beaten in the event by fellow Australian Susie O'Neill (who took silver), and Liu Limin of China (who won gold).

She swam for most of her career at the Telopea Swimming Club in Canberra, Australia under the direction of former Australian butterfly coach Peter Freney. She was teammates to Australian representative and University of Nevada scholarship holder Anthony Rogis, Australian representative Chloe Flutter and Syracuse University scholarship holders Francis Williams and Ben Henri. She moved to Queensland in 1995 and was then coached by Scott Volkers.

1996 Olympics
She combined with Helen Denman, Sarah Ryan and Nicole Stevenson to qualify Australia for the final, before Susie O'Neill, Samantha Riley, Stevenson and Ryan trailed the United States home. In her only individual event, the 100-metre butterfly, Kennedy was eliminated in the heats.

2000 Olympics
She attempted to qualify for the 2000 Summer Olympics in Sydney, but finished eighth in the 100-metre butterfly at the Australian Championships. Petria Thomas and Susie O'Neill were selected. Her attempt in the 200-metre individual medley was even less successful, failing to reach the final.

In 2007, Kennedy started working for the Queensland Police Force.

Personal life
Angela Kennedy was born to Bob and Helen Kennedy on 28 February 1976 in Nambour, Queensland. Later, she lived in Queanbeyan, New South Wales, where she attended school.

Kennedy married high school friend Glen Woodward in 2003, in a private ceremony on Magnetic Island, Queensland. She is step mother to Woodward's oldest son Hayden (b. 1995), and mother to sons Sam (b. 2004) and Will (b. 2008).

See also
 List of Olympic medalists in swimming (women)
 World record progression 50 metres butterfly
 World record progression 100 metres butterfly

References

Other Sources

External links
 Telopea Swim Club page - Angela Kennedy.

1976 births
Living people
Australian female butterfly swimmers
Australian female freestyle swimmers
Olympic swimmers of Australia
Swimmers at the 1996 Summer Olympics
Olympic silver medalists for Australia
People from Nambour, Queensland
World record setters in swimming
World Aquatics Championships medalists in swimming
Australian police officers
Medalists at the FINA World Swimming Championships (25 m)
Medalists at the 1996 Summer Olympics
Olympic silver medalists in swimming
Women police officers
ACT Academy of Sport alumni
20th-century Australian women